Perakas Rajaram (also known as R. Perakas) is a Malaysian film director, producer, writer and actor. He is well known for directing highly acclaimed Malaysia Tamil film Vennira Iravuggal. He also played a minor role in Jagat.

Filmography
As Director :

Movie

Television 

As Actor :
 2015 - Jagat

Award
 Malaysian Kalai Ulagam Awards for Best Director.

References

External links 
 

Living people
Malaysian film directors
Malaysian people of Indian descent
Malaysian people of Tamil descent
1980 births